Hencida is a village in Hajdú-Bihar County in Hungary with a population of 1,191 people (2015).

People
János Csire was born here in 1951. After graduating from BME (Budapest Technical University), he worked in the construction industry as a mid-level leader engineer. In 1990, he was elected vice mayor in the 3rd District of Budapest and served until 1995. He was re-elected in 2002 and served until 2006.

Geography
The village is in the Northern Great Plain region of eastern Hungary.

References

Populated places in Hajdú-Bihar County